Thomas Jensen (born 19 October 1970 in Aarhus) is a Danish politician, who is a member of the Folketing for the Social Democrats political party. He was elected into parliament at the 2007 Danish general election.

Political career
Jensen was first elected into parliament in the 2007 election. He was reelected in the 2011, 2015 and 2019 elections.

External links 
 Biography on the website of the Danish Parliament (Folketinget)

References 

1970 births
Living people
People from Aarhus
Social Democrats (Denmark) politicians
Members of the Folketing 2007–2011
Members of the Folketing 2011–2015
Members of the Folketing 2015–2019
Members of the Folketing 2019–2022
Members of the Folketing 2022–2026